Fodiator rostratus is a species of flying fish in the genus Fodiator. It reaches a maximum length of 19 cm (7.4 in) and is endemic to the eastern Pacific Ocean from Baja California in the Gulf of California to Peru, including Clipperton Island and the Galapagos Islands.

References

rostratus
Fish described in 1866
Taxa named by Albert Günther